Struckmeyer is a German surname originating probably in Schnathorst, Westfalen, Prussia, now North Rhine-Westphalia, Germany. It is a variant of Struckmeier. Other variants include  Strukmeyer and Struckmÿer. The surname is likely a combination of the German words "strauch" and "meier". Strauch translates to "Shrub", and "Meier" may refer to a farmer.

References

German-language surnames